Syed Ibrahim bin Syed Ahmad is a Malaysian politician who has served as Member of the Pahang State Executive Council (EXCO) under the administration of Menteris Besar Adnan Yaakob and Wan Rosdy Wan Ismail since May 2013, and as a Member of the Pahang State Legislative Assembly (MLA) for Kerdau since March 2011. He is a member of the United Malays National Organisation (UMNO), a component party of the Barisan Nasional (BN) coalition, which has governed Pahang throughout his time in office. In the 2022 Pahang state election, BN did not win an outright majority in the Pahang State Legislative Assembly, and subsequently formed a coalition government with Pakatan Harapan where Syed Ibrahim retained his EXCO position.

Election Results

Notes

References

United Malays National Organisation politicians
Members of the Pahang State Legislative Assembly
Pahang state executive councillors
21st-century Malaysian politicians
Living people
Year of birth missing (living people)
People from Pahang
Malaysian people of Malay descent
Malaysian Muslims